This is a list of the 72 members of the European Parliament for Italy in the 2009 to 2014 session.

After the entry into force of the Treaty of Lisbon, the seats of Italy in the European Parliament increased from 72 to 73 per 1 December 2011. The additional seat was assigned to Union of the Centre (that went from 5 to 6 seats).

List

Party representation

Notes

Italy
List
2009